The community of Kalgoorlie-Boulder in the Eastern Goldfields of  Western Australia had an energetic newspaper publishing industry in the late 1890s and early 1900s.

The effect of the newspapers was important in the politics of the state of Western Australia, in particular the lead up to  Federation, the rise of labour politics, and the evolution of political parties in the state.

By the end of the initial boom in mining and establishment of more industrial scale mining, a number of smaller publishing ventures had been and gone.

Titles 
 Western Argus, 1894 - known as Western Argus between 1894-1896, Kalgoorlie Western Argus between 1896-1916, and Western Argus between 1916-1938.
 Kalgoorlie Miner, 1895
 The Hannan's Herald, 1895-6
 Kalgoorlie (and) Boulder Standard, 1897-1898
 Boulder Miner's Right, 1897
 The Evening Star, 1898-1921
 The Sun, 1898-1919
 Westralian Worker, 1898
 Hannan's Hatchet, 1902
 WA Clarion, 1903
 Westralian Clarion, 1903
 Sunday Figaro, 1904
 Sporting Life, 1905-1906

 Post First World War titles

 The Eastern Goldfields mining times, 1920
 The Goldfields observer, 1930-1939

References

City of Kalgoorlie–Boulder
Newspapers published in Goldfields-Esperance
Lists of newspapers published in Western Australia